Parastrachiidae is a family of true bugs belonging to the ordo Hemiptera. It had been considered to be a subfamily under family Cydnidae, but it was raised to family status in 2002.

Genera
 Dismegistus Amyot & Serville, 1843
 Parastrachia Distant, 1883

References

 

Shield bugs
Heteroptera families